The 1976 Isle of Man TT was the fifth round of the 1976 Grand Prix motorcycle racing season held on the Isle of Man between 7 June and 12 June 1976. The racing would be the final time the Isle of Man TT was an official round on the Grand Prix calendar. Although it had once been the most prestigious race of the year, racing around the Snaefell Mountain Course had been increasingly boycotted by the eras' top riders over safety concerns. 

Bowing to pressure for increased rider safety at racing events, FIM moved the Grand Prix to England in 1977 with the British Grand Prix being held at the Silverstone Circuit. However the Isle of Man TT, as it had before 1949 continued as a stand-alone event.

Senior TT (500cc) classification

Junior TT (350 cc) classification

Lightweight TT (250 cc) classification

500 cc Sidecar TT classification

Non-championship races

1000 cc Sidecar TT

1000 cc Open Classic TT

Production TT

References

NOTE:  The Isle of Man TT was removed from the international calendar and replaced by a proper British motorcycle Grand Prix.

Isle of Man TT
Tourist Trophy
Isle of Man TT
Isle of Man TT